Emamzadeh Abdollah (also Romanized as Emāmzādeh ʿAbdollah; also known as Khānābād) is a village in Kuh Sardeh Rural District, in the Central District of Malayer County, Hamadan Province, Iran. At the 2006 census, its population was 353, in 78 families.

References 

Populated places in Malayer County